Jonathan Byrd may refer to:

Jonathan Byrd (musician) (born 1970), American singer-songwriter
Jonathan Byrd (golfer) (born 1978), American golfer